Barber v Guardian Royal Exchange Assurance Group (1990) C-262/88 is an EU labour law and UK labour law case concerning sex discrimination in pensions.

Facts
UK law allowed employers to set different occupational pension entitlement ages. Barber claimed against his employer, Guardian Royal Exchange Assurance, that he should be able to get an occupational pension at the same time as his woman co-workers. The Court of Appeal made a reference to the European Court of Justice whether this violated community law on equal treatment of the sexes.

Judgment
The European Court of Justice held that TFEU article 157 (now TEC article 119) precluded men and women having different age conditions for pension entitlements. Occupational pension schemes are included as pay, even though the scheme operated by a trust technically independent of the employers. It operated in partial substitution for benefits under the state social security system, even if it is with reference to a national scheme.

See also

UK labour law
EU law
European labour law
Unfair dismissal

Notes

References

United Kingdom labour case law
Court of Justice of the European Union case law
1990 in case law
1990 in British law
Anti-discrimination law in the United Kingdom
European Union labour case law